Camille Coduri (born 18 April 1965) is an English actress. She is best known for playing Jackie Tyler, the mother of Rose Tyler, in Doctor Who, and also for her roles as Faith in Nuns on the Run, Miranda in King Ralph, and Dot Clapton, chambers secretary in Rumpole of the Bailey.

Career
She is featured in the film comedies Hawks (1988), Nuns on the Run (1990) and King Ralph (1991). She has also appeared extensively on British television, appearing in guest roles in episodes of series such as Rumpole of the Bailey, A Bit of Fry & Laurie, Boon, A Touch of Frost and in the BBC's 1997 adaptation of Henry Fielding's novel The History of Tom Jones, a Foundling. She appeared in BBC Three's six-part drama series Sinchronicity (2006).

Coduri recurred regularly in the first two series of the revived Doctor Who as Jackie Tyler and reprised her role in the Series 4 episode "Journey's End" (2008) and David Tennant's final episode, "The End of Time" (2010).
 She also participated in a Doctor Who-themed episode of The Weakest Link, first broadcast on 30 March 2007. She won the game, beating Noel Clarke (Mickey Smith) in the final round, splitting the prize money of £16,550 evenly between multiple sclerosis and children who are carers.

In an episode of Ashes to Ashes (April 2010), Coduri played a woman who helps DCI Gene Hunt and DI Alex Drake during an investigation. In September 2010, she joined BBC Three comedy Him & Her, playing Shelly.

On 15 May 2017, it was announced that Coduri would reprise her role as Jackie Tyler in the Doctor Who Big Finish Productions audio Infamy of the Zaross, which was released on 23 November 2017. She also reprised her role as Jackie Tyler in the Big Finish audios Wednesdays For Beginners (part of The Lives of Captain Jack, 2017), Retail Therapy (part of The Ninth Doctor Chronicles, 2017), The Siege of Big Ben and Flight into Hull (part of Short Trips, 2018).

She is also the narrator of the Ninth Doctor audiobooks The Monsters Inside (2011), The Stealers of Dreams (2011), Winner Takes All (2011) and Rose (2018) (novellisation), as well as the Tenth Doctor novelisation The Christmas Invasion (2018), produced by BBC Audio.

Personal life
Coduri was born in Wandsworth, London. She married actor Christopher Fulford in 1992. They have two children, Rosa (born 1993) who is also an actress, and Santino (born 1996).

Filmography

Film

Television

References

External links

1965 births
Living people
People from Wandsworth
English television actresses
20th-century English actresses
21st-century English actresses
Actresses from London
English film actresses
English people of Italian descent